Phosphatidylinositol-4-phosphate 5-kinase type-1 beta is an enzyme that in humans is encoded by the PIP5K1B gene.

Abnormal silencing of the PIP5K1B gene contributes to the cytoskeletal defects seen in Friedreich's ataxia.

References

Further reading